Chalvey Halt was a short-lived railway station on the Great Western Railway branch from  to Windsor & Eton. It was situated just to the north of the bridge carrying the railway over Chalvey Road in Chalvey, south-western Slough, England. It was open for just fourteen months.

History
The branch line to Windsor had opened in 1849, but for many years there were no intermediate stations. On 6 May 1929 the Great Western Railway opened a halt in Chalvey one mile from Slough station adjacent to the bridge over Chalvey Road, in an attempt to draw local traffic. This did not materialise and the halt closed on 6 July 1930.

Revival
In 2010, there were plans to re-open this station connecting passengers from Slough to Heathrow. In October 2012, Slough Borough Council launched a consultation with local residents regarding the station's reopening as part of a regeneration strategy for the community.

References

External links
Site of Chalvey Halt on navigable 1948 O.S. map

Disused railway stations in Berkshire
Former Great Western Railway stations
Railway stations in Great Britain opened in 1929
Railway stations in Great Britain closed in 1930
Transport in Slough
Proposed railway stations in England